Duan Yu (1083–1176), courtesy name Heyu, also known by his temple name as the Emperor Xianzong of Dali, was the 16th emperor of the Dali Kingdom, reigning between 1108 and 1147. Following a family tradition, Duan's father, Duan Zhengchun, abdicated and became a monk in 1108. Duan succeeded his father as the emperor of Dali and renamed himself Duan Zhengyan (段正嚴). He abdicated and became a monk in 1147 and was succeeded by his son Duan Zhengxing.

In fiction

Duan Yu is fictionalized as one of the main characters in the wuxia  Demi-Gods and Semi-Devils by Louis Cha.

 Portrayed in Demi-Gods and Semi-Devils by Kent Tong (1982)
 Portrayed in Demi-Gods and Semi-Devils by Eddie Kwan (1991)
 Portrayed in Demi-Gods and Semi-Devils by Benny Chan (1997)
 Portrayed in Demi-Gods and Semi-Devils by Jimmy Lin (2003)
 Portrayed in Demi-Gods and Semi-Devils by Kim Ki-bum (2013)
 Portrayed in Demi-Gods and Semi-Devils by Bai Shu (2021)

Notes

Dali emperors
Chinese Buddhist monarchs
12th-century Chinese monarchs
1083 births
1176 deaths
Monarchs who abdicated